17β-Hydroxysteroid dehydrogenase 3 (17β-HSD3) is an enzyme that in humans is encoded by the HSD17B3 gene and is involved in androgen steroidogenesis.

Function

This isoform of 17β-HSD is expressed predominantly in the testis and catalyzes the conversion of androstenedione to testosterone. It preferentially uses NADP as cofactor. Deficiency can result in impaired virilization of genetically male infants, formerly termed male pseudohermaphroditism.

See also
 17β-Hydroxysteroid dehydrogenase

References

Further reading